Lleyton Hewitt was the defending champion but lost in the semifinals to Francisco Clavet.

Clavet won in the final 6–4, 6–2 against Magnus Norman.

Seeds

  Pete Sampras (first round)
  Andre Agassi (first round)
  Magnus Norman (final)
  Lleyton Hewitt (semifinals)
  Thomas Enqvist (second round)
  Tim Henman (quarterfinals)
  Marcelo Ríos (quarterfinals)
  Sjeng Schalken (first round)

Draw

Finals

Top half

Bottom half

External links
 Main draw

Tennis Channel Open
2001 ATP Tour
2001 Tennis Channel Open